The little weed whiting (Neoodax balteatus) is a species of ray-finned fish, a weed whiting from the family Odacidae which is endemic to Australia. It occurs along the Southern Australian coast, including Tasmania, ranging north to Cockburn Sound on the Indian Ocean side, and to north of the city of Sydney on the Pacific Ocean side. It inhabits marine and brackish waters, preferring sheltered areas such as estuaries and also on rocky reefs and in seagrass beds. This species grows to a length of  SL. It can also be found in the aquarium trade. This species is the only known member of its genus.

References

Odacidae
Taxa named by Achille Valenciennes
Fish described in 1840